Sarah R. Lotfi (born August 20, 1988)  is a young filmmaker known for her World War II epic  The Last Bogatyr (2009), a finalist in consideration for the 37th Student Academy Awards.

While still in highschool during production of her first historical epic To Be Queen (2005), Lotfi's first cinematic attempt to adapt the love-story of Henry VIII and Anne Boleyn. In 2008 Lotfi revised the story into a surreal short Tudor Rose which went on to play at CineYouth International Film Festival

Daughter of an Iranian immigrant and Chinese-American, Lotfi favors cinematic adaptions that examine multi-cultural influences. The Last Bogatyr (2009) examines the Russian identity during the 1940s, while Lotfi's animation La Mutacion de Fortune (2010) a poetic bio-pic of 15th century philosopher Christine de Pizan.

In 2010 Sarah participated in the "National College TV Internship Program" through the Academy of Television Arts and Sciences working on the set of HBO Films Cinema Verite (2012).

Lotfi began production in 2012 on another World War II film Menschen (German word for 'humans') which explores developmental disability in the last days of the war. The film is deeply personal for Lotfi, since she is the older sibling to a brother and sister with Down Syndrome. Menschen made its world premiere at Phoenix Film Festival in April 2013.

References

 Menschen Official Movie Website
 Academy Press Release for 2010 37th Student Academy Awards
 Website

External links
Lotfi at the Los Angeles Women's International Film Festival for The Last Bogatyr March 2010. Photo by Tom Wilki 

Living people
American film producers
American film directors
American people of Iranian descent
1988 births